The Church of St. Ilija in Krupa na Vrbasu is a  Serbian Orthodox church located in Krupa na Vrbasu, Bosnia and Herzegovina. It is located about twenty kilometers upstream from Banja Luka in the Republic of Srpska.

The church was declared a national monument on the list of national monuments in Bosnia and Herzegovina.

References

Buildings and structures in Republika Srpska
Serbian Orthodox monasteries in Bosnia and Herzegovina